Marco Visconti is an Italian television series which originally aired in one series of six episodes in 1975. A historical adventure, it is based on the 1834 novel of the same title by Tommaso Grossi which had previously been made into 1925 and 1941 films.

Main cast
 Raf Vallone as  Marco Visconti 
 Pamela Villoresi as Bice 
 Sandro Tuminelli as Oldrado 
 Gianni Garko as Lupo
 Warner Bentivegna as Lodrisio 
 Liliana Feldman as  Marianna 
Gabriele Lavia as  Ottorino 
 Maresa Gallo as  Lauretta
 Franca Nuti as  Ermelinda 
 Francesco Di Federico as  Ambrogio 
 Carlo Montagna as  Pelagrua
 Herbert Pagani as  Tremacoldo 
 Leonardo Severini as  Il Pievano 
 Armando Celso as  Gentiluomo
 Enzo Fisichella as Il maggiordomo 
 Evaldo Rogato as  Popolano 
 Gianni Quillico as  Un servo 
 Franco Ferrari as  Gentiluomo 
 Franco Moraldi as  Gentiluomo 
 Bruno Vilar as  Gentiluomo 
 Ottavio Fanfani as  Il vescovo di Lucca 
 Roberto Pistone as  Gentiluomo 
 Mario Mattia Giorgetti as  Primo gentiluomo lucchese 
 Aldo Suligoj as  Gentiluomo 
 Sergio Masieri as  Secondo gentiluomo lucchese 
 Carlo Sabatini as  Azzone Visconti 
 Itala Martini as  Dama 
 Licia Lombardi as  Dama 
 Umberto Tabarelli as  L'abate Giovanni Visconti 
 Aldo Pierantoni as  Il Decano del popolo 
 Marcello Mandò as Vinciguerra 
 Sergio Renda as  Birago

References

Bibliography
Moliterno, Gino. The A to Z of Italian Cinema. Scarecrow Press, 2009.

External links
 

1970s Italian television series
Italian-language television shows
Television series set in the 14th century
Television shows set in Milan